Metal Health is the third studio album by American heavy metal band Quiet Riot, released on March 11, 1983. The album spawned the hit singles "Cum On Feel the Noize" and "Metal Health". It was the band's first album to receive a worldwide release, as the first two were released only in Japan.

Metal Health was the first heavy metal album to reach number one on the Billboard 200 chart, replacing the Police's Synchronicity at number one in November 1983. Due to its commercial success, Metal Health is regarded by some as the catalyst that opened the door for hair metal's immense popularity throughout the next several years. The album went on to sell more than ten million copies worldwide.

Overview
The band parted ways with bassist Chuck Wright early in the recording process, and replacement Gary Van Dyke was not working out. Vocalist Kevin DuBrow asked the band's former bassist Rudy Sarzo to take part in the recording of "Thunderbird", a song he had written as a tribute to the band's founder Randy Rhoads, who died in a 1982 plane crash. While DuBrow began writing the song while Rhoads was still alive,  it wasn't completed until after the guitarist's death. The partnership was quite fruitful and Sarzo ended up recording several songs with the band, and he ultimately left his spot with Ozzy Osbourne to re-join Quiet Riot as a permanent member.

In support of the album, Quiet Riot opened for Black Sabbath on their Born Again tour in the US. They also managed to secure a spot on the 1983 US Festival alongside established acts such as Ozzy Osbourne and Judas Priest. Prior to Quiet Riot's US Festival performance, Sarzo was punched in the face backstage by a drunken Osbourne, still bitter over the bassist leaving him to rejoin Quiet Riot several months prior.

Due to the band's subsequent failure to match Metal Health'''s commercial success, Quiet Riot have at times been referred to as "one-hit wonders". The title track was ranked No. 35 on VH1's 40 Greatest Metal Songs. "Slick Black Cadillac" is a re-recording of a song that appeared on the band's 1978 album Quiet Riot II''.

Track listing

Personnel

Quiet Riot
Kevin DuBrow – lead vocals
Carlos Cavazo – guitars, backing vocals
Rudy Sarzo – bass guitar, backing vocals
Frankie Banali – drums, backing vocals

Additional personnel
Chuck Wright – bass guitar on "Metal Health" & "Don't Wanna Let You Go"
Riot Squad - backing vocals
Tuesday Knight – backing vocals 
Spencer Proffer – backing vocals
Donna Slattery – backing vocals
Pat Regan - Keyboards

Production
Arranged by Quiet Riot
Produced by Spencer Proffer
Recorded and mixed by Duane Baron at The Pasha Music House
All songs published by The Grand Pasha Publisher, except "Cum on Feel the Noize" (Barn Publishing, Inc)

Design
Quiet Riot – artwork
Jay Vigon – art direction, design
Sam Emerson – photography
Ron Sobol – photography
Stan Watts – illustrations

Chart positions

Certifications

Accolades

References

Quiet Riot albums
Pasha Records albums
1983 albums
Albums produced by Spencer Proffer